Bairak is a village in Sumy Oblast (province) of eastern Ukraine with a population of 734.

Gallery

References

Villages in Romny Raion